Old Habits was planned to be Smash Mouth's fifth studio album and was expected to be released in the summer of 2005. According to the band's official website at the time, the album was going to sound much more like ska punk, similar to Fush Yu Mang and The East Bay Sessions. In September 2005, the band performed what was tentatively going to be the album's first single, "Getaway Car", on Last Call with Carson Daly. The album was delayed many times, in the hope of gaining publicity with Steve's appearance on the reality show The Surreal Life. Smash Mouth returned to the studio intent on making their new record better, however, Old Habits was eventually shelved and most tracks were remixed and released on Summer Girl. One also ended up on Greg Camp's solo album Defektor.

The full announcement on their website read:

The album's cover featured Greg Camp's '64 Ford Falcon Squire wagon which was also depicted on the cover of Fush Yu Mang.

Official track listing (from the discography on their website as retrieved on June 30, 2005):

 01. Hey LA*
 02. Getaway Car*
 03. The Crawl*
 04. Say When
 05. Baby Please Don't Go**
 06. Quality Control*
 07. Old Habits****
 08. Sugar
 09. Beside Myself***
 10. Duty Free***
 11. Beautiful Bomb*
 12. Never Let Me Down Again***

* Later released on Summer Girl

** Later released on Greg Camp's Defektor

*** Later released on SoundCloud 

**** Later released on Greg Camp's side project's self-titled The Maids Of Honor album

References

Unreleased albums
Smash Mouth albums